The Federal Data Services Hub is a tool used to facilitate the government-backed Patient Protection and Affordable Care Act health coverage program.

Origins
It is built by the Internal Revenue Service (IRS) and Health and Human Services (HHS).  It combines data on income and employment from IRS records, health and entitlements from HHS records, identity from Social Security, citizenship from Department of Homeland Security records, criminality from Department of Justice records, and residency from state records. Also involved will be the Department of Defense, the Department of Veterans Affairs, the Office of Personnel Management, the Peace Corps, and state Medicaid administrations.

Content
Data includes:

References

External links
 Federal Data Services Hub Frequently Asked Questions from Medicaid

Federal government of the United States
Databases in the United States